Carlos Eduardo Bezerra Chinin (born 3 May 1985 in São Paulo) is a decathlete from Brazil.

At the 2007 Pan American Games in Rio de Janeiro, the first Chinin's Pan, he won the bronze medal in the decathlon. He finished the first day in the second place, dropped to fourth after nine races, but made a startling rise in the last race, the 1500 m, finishing with 7977 points and medal.

At the 2007 Universiade in Bangkok, Chinin won a bronze medal, making 7920 points.

At the Olympic Games Beijing 2008 in China, Chinin suffered a spasm in the buttocks during the second step of the decathlon (long jump), and had difficulties in the other competitions. He had bad performances in the shot put, high jump and 400 meter. Then, on the second day, not disputed the 110 meter hurdles, and was eliminated 

In June 2013, Chinin broke the South American record in the decathlon, with the mark of 8393 points. Thus, he qualified for the 2013 World Championships in Athletics, obtaining the third best mark this year's World Ranking. The South American record earlier belonged to Luiz Alberto de Araujo, who had reached 8,276 points in 2012.

At the 2013 World Championships in Moscow, he made great competition until the ninth and penultimate round, where he was in fifth place, near the bronze medal. Chinin finished in sixth place with 8388 points, 5 of his South American record. Chinin hit 4 personal bests (10s78 in the 100m, 14s05 in the 110m hurdles, 5.10m in the pole vault and 59.98 m in the Javelin) and made the best campaign of a Brazilian in the World Championships on decathlon.

Achievements

References 

 

1985 births
Living people
Brazilian decathletes
Olympic athletes of Brazil
Athletes (track and field) at the 2007 Pan American Games
Athletes (track and field) at the 2008 Summer Olympics
Athletes from São Paulo
Pan American Games bronze medalists for Brazil
Pan American Games medalists in athletics (track and field)
Universiade medalists in athletics (track and field)
South American Games gold medalists for Brazil
South American Games medalists in athletics
Competitors at the 2006 South American Games
Universiade bronze medalists for Brazil
Medalists at the 2007 Summer Universiade
Medalists at the 2007 Pan American Games